Oskar Viktor Olsen (17 October 1897 – 28 December 1956) was a Norwegian speed skater and Olympic medalist. He received a silver medal at the 1924 Winter Olympics in Chamonix. He also competed at the 1928 Winter Olympics.

References

External links

1897 births
1956 deaths
Norwegian male speed skaters
Speed skaters at the 1924 Winter Olympics
Speed skaters at the 1928 Winter Olympics
Olympic speed skaters of Norway
Medalists at the 1924 Winter Olympics
Olympic medalists in speed skating
Olympic silver medalists for Norway